Lattone, an Anglicisation of the Gaelic, ‘Leath Tóin’ meaning The Half-Side of a Hollow, i.e. ‘A Hillside’ is a townland in the civil parish of Templeport, County Cavan, Ireland. It lies in the Roman Catholic parish of Glangevlin and barony of Tullyhaw.

Geography

Lattone is bounded on the north by Derrylahan townland, on the south by Drumhurrin townland, on the west by Derrynatuan townland and on the east by Corratawy townland. Its chief geographical features are Lattone Lough, the River Shannon, mountain streams and dug wells. The townland is traversed by the regional R206 road (Ireland), minor public roads and rural lanes. The townland covers 98 statute acres.

History

In 1720 Morley Saunders was in possession. He leased his interest in Latones to Colonel John Enery of Bawnboy by deed dated 24 December 1720.

A deed dated 13 Nov 1738 includes: Lattoones.

The 1790 Cavan Carvaghs list spells the name as Lattons.

The Tithe Applotment Books for 1826 list five tithepayers in the townland and spell it as Latune.

The Lattone Valuation Office Field books are available for July 1839.

Griffith's Valuation of 1857 lists five landholders in the townland.

In the 19th century the landlord of Lattone was the Annesley Estate.

Census

In the 1901 census of Ireland, there are three families listed in the townland.

In the 1911 census of Ireland, there are three families listed in the townland.

Antiquities

 A  boat-house
 Stone bridges over the rivers, including 'Shannon Bridge'.
 A weir
 Stepping stones over the River Shannon.
 A thatched house, which is listed in the ‘Record of Protected Structures; County Cavan’, No. CV03001

References

External links
The IreAtlas Townland Data Base

Townlands of County Cavan